Elias H. Geiger House, also known as the  Geiger-Weidman House, is a historic home located at Ossian near Dansville in Livingston County, New York. It is a large two story wood frame Italianate style building built in 1866 or 1867 by master carpenter Elias H. Geiger.  Also on the property are two contributing barns constructed in 1937.

It was listed on the National Register of Historic Places in 2006.

References

Houses on the National Register of Historic Places in New York (state)
Italianate architecture in New York (state)
Houses in Livingston County, New York
National Register of Historic Places in Livingston County, New York